Australia Tour EP 2002 is an EP released by The Pernice Brothers, consisting of reworked, "stripped-down" [] versions of songs from the band's first two albums (Overcome by Happiness and The World Won't End). The songs were recorded during an Australian tour in January 2002.  The track listing on the CD release is incorrect, with "All I Know" listed as track 2 and "Flaming Wreck" listed as track 3.  The correct track listing is below.

Track listing

References

Pernice Brothers albums
2003 debut EPs
Live EPs